

Naree Budjong Djara National Park is a national park on North Stradbroke Island, Queensland, Australia. It contains the former Blue Lake National Park.

History 
The  national park was announced on 27 March 2011 by Queensland Premier Anna Bligh and Environment minister Kate Jones.

The name Naree Budjong Djara means My Mother Earth in the Qandamooka language.

See also 

 Protected areas of Queensland

References 

National parks of Queensland
North Stradbroke Island